Kyirong is a language from the subgroup of Tibetic languages spoken in the Gyirong County of the Shigatse prefecture, of the Tibetan Autonomous Region. 

Kyirong has lexical tone, with a three-tone system.

Relationship to other languages 
There is a varying degree of mutual intelligibility between Kyirong and other Kyirong-Yolmo varieties. It is most closely related to the Nubri and Gyalsomdo languages, and more distantly related to other languages in the family.

Phonology

Consonants 
There are 36 consonants in Kyirong, which are summarized in the table below.

Vowels 
There are eight places of articulation for vowels. There is a length distinction at each place of articulation, as well as a long nasalised vowel.

Tone 
Kyriong has a three tone system; high, medium and low. Low tone is often accompanied by breathy voice.

Sources 

  Hedlin, M. (2011). An Investigation of the relationship between the Kyirong, Yòlmo, and Standard Spoken Tibetan speech varieties. Masters thesis, Payap University, Chiang Mai.
 Huber, B. (2005). The Tibetan dialect of Lende (Kyirong). Beiträge zur tibetischen Erzählforschung, 15.

References

Central Bodish languages
Languages of Nepal
Languages of Tibet